Wild Planet is the second studio album by American new wave band the B-52's, released in 1980 by Warner Bros. Records.

As with their first album, the B-52's traveled to Compass Point Studios in the Bahamas to record Wild Planet. Several of the songs from the album had been concert staples since 1978. The band deliberately did not record them for their first album because they had too many tracks and wanted a strong second album, knowing that performing the tracks live would make fans look forward to it.

Film director Gus Van Sant later referred to the song "Private Idaho" in the title of his 1991 film My Own Private Idaho and thanked the band in the film's credits, although he did not seek approval from the band to use it.

Reception

Commercial
Wild Planet charted for 27 weeks on the Billboard 200, peaking at No. 18. Wild Planet was certified Gold by the RIAA.

Critical
Billboard gave Wild Planet a positive review, calling it an improvement over the band's debut album and "a cinch for hot rotation in rock-oriented discos". Robert Christgau of The Village Voice observed, "'Party Out of Bounds' and 'Quiche Lorraine' are expert entertainments at best and the wacko parochialism of 'Private Idaho' is a positive annoyance. Only on 'Devil in My Car' and 'Give Me Back My Man' do they exploit the potential for meaning—cosmic and emotional, respectively—that accrues to the world's greatest new-wave kiddie-novelty disco-punk band." Frank Rose of Rolling Stone felt that it "plainly lacks the relentless exuberance of the group's debut disc", which he considered "partly a result of the production: flatter and duller sounding than its predecessor". While Trouser Press thought the album had its "inspired moments", they concluded that "too much of the album, with its short length and recycled ideas, comes across as a pale imitation of its predecessor."

In a retrospective review for AllMusic, David Cleary thought the songs were "faster, tighter, and punchier than previously, though production values are not as wonderfully quirky and detailed", and highlighted the "cunning mix of girl group, garage band, surf, and television theme song influences, all propelled along by an itchy dance beat."

Track listing

Personnel
The B-52's
 Kate Pierson
 Fred Schneider
 Keith Strickland
 Cindy Wilson
 Ricky Wilson

Technical
 Rhett Davies – producer, engineer
 The B-52's – producers
 Chris Blackwell – executive producer 
 Benjamin Armbrister – assistant engineer
 Robert Waldrop – art direction
 Lynn Goldsmith – cover photography
 La Verne & Phyllis – hairdos
 Paul Bricker – makeup

Chart performance

Weekly charts

Year-end charts

Certifications and sales

References

The B-52's albums
1980 albums
Albums produced by Rhett Davies
Albums produced by Chris Blackwell
Warner Records albums